Banagram Union is a union parishad of Katiadi Upazila under Kishoreganj District of Dhaka Division.

References

Katiadi Upazila